In mathematics, a collapsing algebra is a type of Boolean algebra sometimes used in forcing to reduce ("collapse") the size of cardinals. The posets used to generate collapsing algebras were introduced by Azriel Lévy in 1963.

The collapsing algebra of λω is a complete Boolean algebra with at least λ elements but generated by a countable number of elements. As the size of countably generated complete Boolean algebras is unbounded, this shows that there is no free complete Boolean algebra on a countable number of elements.

Definition

There are several slightly different sorts of collapsing algebras. 

If κ and λ are cardinals, then the Boolean algebra of regular open sets of the product space κλ is a collapsing algebra. Here κ and λ are both given the discrete topology. There are several different options for the topology of 
κλ. The simplest option is to take the usual product topology. Another option is to take the topology generated by open sets consisting of functions whose value is specified on less than λ elements of λ.

References

 
 
  

Boolean algebra
Forcing (mathematics)